Nothing to Lose (or Neung buak neung pen soon, literally, 1+1=0) is a 2002 Thai crime-comedy-drama film written and directed by Danny Pang of the Pang Brothers. It is Danny Pang's solo directorial debut, and is part of the loose "Bangkok Trilogy" by the Pangs that also includes Bangkok Dangerous (1999) and One Take Only (2003).

Plot
Somchai, a debt-ridden gambling addict, goes to the top of a building to commit suicide and finds a young woman, Go-go, standing on the ledge ready to do the same.

Rather than going through with the plans for death, the two talk and decide that there's nothing they can't do, since they had decided to die.

So they embark on a crime spree, starting out by eating in a restaurant and not paying the bill, then stealing a car and crashing it for fun.

They rob a convenience store, and are pursued by the police, and the gangsters Somchai pursue the couple as well.

Awards
The film won two awards at the Thailand National Film Association Awards: Best Actress for Arisara Wongchalee, and Best Costumes.

Cast
Arisara Wongchalee as Gogo
Pierre Png as Somchai
Yvonne Lim as Daderufang
Nimponth Chaisirikul

Release
Nothing to Lose has been issued on DVD in Thailand, but despite what the package says, it has no English subtitles.

External links

2000s crime comedy-drama films
2002 directorial debut films
Films directed by Danny Pang
Thai comedy-drama films
2002 comedy films
2002 drama films